Doleto Prison is a prison located in the Doleto neighborhood of Sardasht,West Azerbaijan, Iran. 
During the early stages of the Iranian Revolution, members of the Democratic Party of Iranian Kurdistan committed a series of human rights violations and war crimes against detainees in the Doleto prison in Iran, including physical abuse, forced labour, executions and torture.
Doleto Prison has been accused of committing "serious human rights abuses" against its political dissidents and critics of the Democratic Party of Iranian Kurdistan.
This prison was active from 1978 to 1982.

Background

The prison was located on northwest of Sardasht.
The prison was located in a mountainous area.

The prison was a Stable. The Democratic Party of Iranian Kurdistan turned it into a prison. The prison was used to hold approximately 200 men in poor conditions, and torture and execution were frequent. According to the survivors of that prison, prisoners were used to do things that were interpreted as forced labor.

In this prison, about 200 prisoners of government forces, including the Islamic Revolutionary Guard Corps, the Army of the Islamic Republic of Iran, the Gendarmerie of the Islamic Republic of Iran, Jihad of Construction, and the Kurdish Muslim Peshmerga were held.

On May 7, 1981, two Iraqi aircraft dropped bombs on Dolato prison. The numbers of victims were initially estimated as 65 dead and 60 injured.
There were few guards on the day of the attack.
They were informed of this attack.
Democratic Party of Iranian Kurdistan were aware that an Iraqi attack was imminent.

References and notes

Prisons in Iran